Mittiebah Station, mostly referred to as Mittiebah, is a pastoral lease operating as a cattle station in the Northern Territory of Australia.

The property shares a boundary to the south with Alexandria Station, to the west with Brunette Downs Station, to the north with Benmarra Station and to the east with both Mount Drummond Station and Waanyi-Garawa Aboriginal Land Trust.

The Playford River runs through the property, which encompasses a wide range of types from Rangeland to open plains of Mitchell Grass. Mount Morgan is on the property.

 the station is owned by the North Australian Pastoral Company (NAPCo), which acquired the property in 2001. The station had already been owned by the company once before when it was part of Alexandria Station, before being resumed by the Northern Territory Government in 1965.

See also
List of ranches and stations
List of the largest stations in Australia

References

Stations (Australian agriculture)
Pastoral leases in the Northern Territory